Kanattakankanamlage Jayamali Indika Kankanange (born 25 September 1974) is a former Sri Lankan woman cricketer. She was a member of the Sri Lankan cricket team at the 2000 Women's Cricket World Cup

References

External links 

1974 births
Living people
Sri Lankan women cricketers
Sri Lanka women One Day International cricketers
Colts Cricket Club cricketers